National Tertiary Route 609, or just Route 609 (or ) is a National Road Route of Costa Rica, located in the Puntarenas province. It is the road between Route 318 in Vasconia, Parrita and Route 34 in Playón Sur, also in Parrita, in the Puntarenas province of Costa Rica.

Description
In Puntarenas province the route covers Parrita canton (Parrita district).

History
This road allows the farmers of papaya, watermelon, rice and African oil palm to export their products.  An asphalt paving project for 14 kilometers started in October 2019 and finished in May 2020 at a cost of CRC ₡ 945 million.

References

Highways in Costa Rica